The Women's PGA Championship is an annual golf competition held in June, and is conducted by the Professional Golfers Association of America (PGA). The event was established in 1955, and is one of the five women's major championships played each year; the others are the ANA Inspiration, the U.S. Women's Open, the Women's British Open, and the Evian Championship. This event has always been conducted in stroke play competition, and is always the second women's major of the year.  The first year was played with three rounds of stroke play and a final round of match play to determine the final places (36 holes for the championship, 18 holes for other matches) in order to distribute prize money.  The trophy, formally known as the "LPGA Championship Trophy" is presented to the champion every year, with each recipient being awarded a replica of the trophy to keep.

Mickey Wright holds the record for the most victories with four.  Annika Sörenstam has the record for most consecutive wins with three. The lowest score for 72 holes on a par 71 golf course is Betsy King's 267, 17-under par in 1992, and on a par 72 golf course is Cristie Kerr's and Yani Tseng's 269, 19-under par in 2010 and 2011 respectively.  The LPGA Championship has had eleven wire-to-wire champions on twelve different occasions: Beverly Hanson in 1955, Wright in 1958 and 1961, Judy Kimball in 1962, Kathy Whitworth in 1967, Sandra Post in 1968, Jan Stephenson in 1982, Nancy Lopez in 1985, King in 1992, Se Ri Pak in 1998, Kerr in 2010, and Tseng in 2011.  The current champion is Inbee Park.

Champions

Key

Multiple champions
This table lists the golfers who have won more than one LPGA Championship. Champions who won in consecutive years are indicated by the years with italics*.
Key

Champions by nationality
This table lists the total number of titles won by golfers of each nationality.
Key

See also
Chronological list of LPGA major golf champions
List of LPGA major championship winning golfers

Notes

 This tournament has had several name changes, which are the following: 1955–86 LPGA Championship, 1987–93 Mazda LPGA Championship, 1994–2000 McDonald's LPGA Championship, 2001–03 McDonald's LPGA Championship presented by AIG, 2004–09 McDonald's LPGA Championship presented by Coca-Cola, 2010 LPGA Championship presented by Wegmans, 2011–14 Wegmans LPGA Championship, and 2015–present KPMG Women's PGA Championship.
 Par is a predetermined number of strokes that a golfer should require to complete a hole, a round (the sum of the total pars of the played holes), or a tournament (the sum of the total pars of each round). E stands for even, which means the tournament was completed in the predetermined number of strokes.
 The first two days over three rounds were conducted in stroke play.
 The last day was a 36-hole final for the championship in match play.
 Marlene Hagge won in a sudden death playoff over Patty Berg.
 Sandra Post won in an 18-hole playoff over Kathy Whitworth.
 Shirley Englehorn won in an 18-hole playoff over Kathy Whitworth.
 Christa Johnson won in a sudden death playoff over Leta Lindley.
 Juli Inkster won in a sudden death playoff over Stefania Croce.
 Annika Sörenstam won in a sudden death playoff over Grace Park.
 Se Ri Pak won in a sudden death playoff over Karrie Webb.
 Yani Tseng won in a sudden death playoff over Maria Hjorth.

References
General

Specific

External links
LPGA Championship history (PDF)
LPGA Tour's tournament profile

Cham
Lists of winners of LPGA major golf championships